Johan Martial (born 30 May 1991) is a French professional footballer who plays as a centre-back for Malaysia Super League club Sri Pahang. He was a France youth international for the under-19 and under-20 teams.

Club career
Martial was born in Massy. He joined SC Bastia after leaving the Auvergne-based outfit AS Montferrand. He received his first call up to the senior squad for their Ligue 2 match against Montpellier on 13 March 2009, and made his professional debut as a late match substitute in the 1–0 victory. 

On 2 August 2010, Bastia loaned Martial to fellow Ligue 1 team Brest for the entire 2010–11 Ligue 1 season. The loan deal was made permanent at the end of the season.

In 2015, after his Brest contract expired, Martial moved to Troyes.

On 20 June 2017, after Troyes regained their place in the top flight, Martial moved abroad for the first time by joining Maccabi Petah Tikva F.C. in the Israeli Premier League. In February 2019, he moved across the league to Ashdod.

On 4 July 2019, he signed a two-year contract with Panetolikos, on a free transfer. He left the club on 6 June 2020 to join Sochaux.

In January 2022 he joined Malaysia Super League side Sri Pahang. He was released by the club in mid season due to injuries.

International career
Martial made his international debut for France under-19 on 9 September 2009 in a 3–3 friendly draw away to Japan. He was part of the team that won the 2010 UEFA European Under-19 Championship on home soil, making an appearance in the final group game, a 1–1 draw with England.

Personal life
Johan is of Guadeloupen descent. He is the younger brother of former Les Ulis captain Dorian Martial and the older brother of Manchester United and France forward Anthony Martial. He is the cousin of Servette midfielder Alexis Martial.

Honours

France under-19
 UEFA European Under-19 Football Championship: 2010
Greek Cup

References

External links
 LFP Profile 
 

1991 births
Living people
French footballers
SC Bastia players
Stade Brestois 29 players
F.C. Ashdod players
Maccabi Petah Tikva F.C. players
Panetolikos F.C. players
FC Sochaux-Montbéliard players
Sri Pahang FC players
Ligue 1 players
Ligue 2 players
Israeli Premier League players
Super League Greece players
Malaysia Super League players
France youth international footballers
French people of Guadeloupean descent
People from Massy, Essonne
Footballers from Essonne
Association football central defenders
Expatriate footballers in Israel
Expatriate footballers in Greece
Expatriate footballers in Malaysia
French expatriate sportspeople in Israel
French expatriate sportspeople in Greece
French expatriate sportspeople in Malaysia